Four Reigns is a Thai historical novel by Kukrit Pramoj. First serialized in the Siam Rath newspaper from 1951 to 1952 and published in book form in 1953, the novel follows the life of Phloi, a girl from a noble family who is brought to live in the royal court. As she grows up and lives her life through the reigns of kings Rama V to Rama VIII (1868–1946), she witnesses the social and political changes in the country leading to and following the abolishment of absolute monarchy in 1932. It is one of the most influential Thai novels, widely regarded as a classic and described by the Encyclopaedia Britannica as "probably the best-selling Thai novel of all time." Four Reigns offers a nostalgic view on the monarchy and aristocracy, contrasting what it paints as former glory days to the struggles Phloi faces following the political upheaval.

References

Thai novels
Novels set in Thailand
1953 novels
Works by Kukrit Pramoj
History of Thailand in fiction